Filatima autocrossa is a moth of the family Gelechiidae. It is found in China, the southern Ural Mountains, the lower Volga region, the Altai Mountains, the Tuva region, the Chita region and the Krasnoyarsk region.

The wingspan is 17–20 mm. The forewings are dark brown with a black spot at the middle of the fold and two further spots at the cell, all surrounded by some ochreous brown scales. The hindwings are fuscous. Females are somewhat smaller than males.

References

Moths described in 1937
Filatima